Estelle Freedman (born 1947) is an American historian.  She is the Edgar E. Robinson Professor in U.S. History at Stanford University  She received her Bachelor of Arts degree from Barnard College in 1969 and her Master of Arts (1972) and PhD (1976) in history from Columbia University.  She has taught at Stanford University since 1976 and is a co-founder of the Program in Feminist Studies.  Her research has explored the history of women and social reform, including feminism and women's prison reform, as well as the history of sexuality, including the history of sexual violence.

Honors and awards 
Freedman is the recipient of four teaching awards at Stanford as well as the Nancy Lyman Roelker Mentorship Award for graduate mentorship from the American Historical Association and the Millicent McIntosh Award for Feminism from Barnard College.  She has received numerous research fellowships, including grants from the National Endowment for the Humanities, the American Association of University Women, the American Council of Learned Societies, and the John Simon Guggenheim Memorial Foundation.  She has been a fellow at the Center for Advanced Study in the Behavioral Sciences and at the Stanford Humanities Center.
    
Her first book, Their Sisters' Keepers received the Alice and Edith Hamilton Prize for best scholarly manuscript on women from the University of Michigan in 1978 and was published in 1981.  She has won the Frances Richardson Keller-Sierra Prize from the Western Association of Women Historians three times: in 1982 for Victorian Women: A Documentary Account (shared), in 1997 for Maternal Justice, and in 2014 for Redefining Rape. Redefining Rape also won the 2014 Darlene Clark Hine Award from the Organization of American Historians and the 2014 Emily Toth Award (Popular Culture Association/American Culture Association).

Her book My Desire for History, coedited with John D'Emilio, received the 2013 John Boswell Prize from the Committee on LGBT History of the American Historical Association.
Her earlier co-authored book with John D'Emilio, Intimate Matters: A History of Sexuality in America, was cited by Justice Anthony Kennedy in his 2003 opinion for Lawrence v. Texas, with which the American Supreme Court overturned all remaining anti-sodomy laws. Her 2013 book Redefining Rape: Sexual Violence in the Era of Suffrage and Segregation won the Darlene Clark Hine Award from the Organization of American Historians.

Works 
 Their Sisters' Keepers: Women's Prison Reform in America, 1830-1930 (Ann Arbor: The University of Michigan Press, 1981).  
 Editor (with Barbara C. Gelpi, Susan L. Johnson, and Kathleen M. Weston), The Lesbian Issue:  Essays From Signs (Chicago: University of Chicago Press, 1985).  
 Associate editor (with  Barbara C. Gelpi and Marilyn Yalom), Victorian Women: A Documentary Account of Women's Lives in Nineteenth-Century England, France and  the United States, eds. Erna O. Hellerstein, Leslie P. Hume, and Karen Offen (Stanford: Stanford University Press, 1981).  
 Intimate Matters: A History of Sexuality in America (with John D'Emilio) (New York: Harper and Row, 1988; 3rd ed. University of Chicago Press, 2012).  
 Maternal Justice: Miriam Van Waters and the Female Reform Tradition (Chicago: University of Chicago Press, 1996).  
 No Turning Back: The History of Feminism and the Future of Women (New York: Ballantine Books, 2002). 
 Feminism, Sexuality, and Politics: Essays by Estelle Freedman (University of North Carolina Press, 2006).  
 The Essential Feminist Reader (New York: The Modern Library, 2007).  
 Editor (with John D'Emilio) My Desire for History: Essays on Gay, Community, and Labor History by Allan Bérubé (University of North Carolina Press, 2011).  
 Foreword, with John D'Emilio, and co-consulting editor, Documenting Intimate Matters: Primary Sources for the a History of Sexuality in America, ed. Thomas A. Foster (University of Chicago Press, 2012).  
 Redefining Rape: Sexual Violence in the Era of Suffrage and Segregation (Harvard University Press, 2013).

References

External links 
 Freedman’s Website
 No Turning Back
Estelle Freedman: An Oral History, Women's March Oral History Project, Stanford Historical Society Oral History Program, 2017

1947 births
21st-century American historians
Barnard College alumni
Center for Advanced Study in the Behavioral Sciences fellows
Living people
Stanford University faculty
American women historians
21st-century American women writers